Richard Douma (born 17 April 1993 in Zaandam) is a Dutch middle-distance runner competing primarily in the 1500 metres. He narrowly missed a medal by finishing fourth at the 2016 European Championships.

International competitions

Personal bests
 800 metres – 1:47.88 (Leiden 2017)
 800 metres indoor – 1:48.90 (Apeldoorn 2019)
 1000 metres – 2:24.26 (Lisse 2015)
 1500 metres – 3:35.77 (Heusden-Zolder 2016)
 1500 metres indoor – 3:41.51 (Toruń 2017)
 One mile – 3:57.60 (London 2016)
 One mile indoor – 4:05.47 (Athlone 2017)
 3000 metres – 8:05.45 (Gothenburg 2018)
 3000 metres indoor – 8:44.67 (Apeldoorn 2012)
 5000 metres – 14:03.04 (Apeldoorn 2022)
 3000 metres steeplechase – 8:40.28 (Nice 2021)
Road
 5 kilometres - 13:27 (Monaco 2021) 
 10 kilometres - 28:08 (Valencia 2020) =
 Half marathon - 1:02:23 (Ghent 2022)
 Marathon - 2:12:21 (Rotterdam 2022)

References

All-Athletics profile

External links
Official site

1993 births
Living people
Dutch male middle-distance runners
Sportspeople from Zaanstad
World Athletics Championships athletes for the Netherlands
Dutch Athletics Championships winners
20th-century Dutch people
21st-century Dutch people